Karlene is an English feminine given name that is a feminine form of Carl and an alternate form of Carla. Notable people referred to by this name include the following:

Given name
Karlene Davis (born 1946), British midwife
Karlene Faith (1938- 2017), Canadian writer
Karlene Haughton (born 1972), Canadian hurdles athlete
Karlene Maywald (born 1961), Australian politician

See also

Carlene (name)
Karlee
Karleen
Karline

Notes

English feminine given names